Anacrusis aerobatica is a species of moth of the family Tortricidae. It is found in Colombia and Ecuador.

References

Moths described in 1917
Atteriini
Moths of South America